Jacking, Jackin’, or the jack is a freestyle dance move in which the dancer ripples their torso back and forth in an undulating motion. It emerged within the context of Chicago house music in the 1980s.

Origins and interpretations
The style is said to have developed in Chicago nightclubs like the Warehouse and the Power Plant, where house pioneer Frankie Knuckles was resident DJ, and Ron Hardy's Music Box, during the early 1980s.

Music journalist Simon Reynolds has argued that just as house music evolved from disco music (among other influences – see House music), jacking evolved from the expressiveness of disco dancing. Even more than disco, house music endorsed an “abandonment of subjectivity and self-will”, promoting the “ecstasy of being enthralled by the beat”. He sees jacking as a reflection of this abandonment of subjectivity:

A similar account on the sexual content of jacking was suggested by Barry Walters in his 1986 article on house music in SPIN magazine:

DJ and record producer Chip E. also explains the body movements in jacking with a reference to sexuality:

"Jackin' house" as a style of music
The terms "jacking", "jackin'", or "jack" found their way into numerous titles of early house music records, such as the Jack Trax EP by Chip E. (1985), "Jack'n the House" (1985) by Farley "Jackmaster" Funk (1985), "Jack Your Body" by Steve "Silk" Hurley (1986), "The Jack That House Built" by Jack 'n' Chill (1987), or "Jack to the Sound of the Underground" by Fast Eddie (1988). 

The term is also transferred to certain styles of house music called "Jackin' House".

See also
 House dance

References

External links
 Sally R. Sommer: "C'mon to My House: Underground-House Dancing", in: Dance Research Journal, Vol. 33, No. 2, 2001, pp. 72–86.
 Czarina Mirani: Spin Slide and Jack: A History of House Dancing on 5 Magazine, 2005.
 Barry Walters: Burning Down the House. SPIN magazine, November 1986.
 Tim Lawrence: Acid ⎯ Can You Jack?. Liner Notes to an acid house compilation, 2005
 Makkada B. Selah: Powder Burns – Essay on house dance  in Village Voice, 2007

1980s fads and trends
1980s neologisms
Culture of Chicago
Dance moves
Dances of the United States